Vistdal Church is a parish church of the Church of Norway in Molde Municipality in Møre og Romsdal county, Norway. It is located in the village of Myklebostad. It is the church for the Vistdal parish which is part of the Molde domprosti (arch-deanery) in the Diocese of Møre. The white, wooden church was built in a long church style in 1869 using plans by the architect Jacob Wilhelm Nordan. The church seats about 270 people.

History

The earliest existing historical records of the church date back to the year 1432, but the church was not new that year. The church may have been built during the 13th century. Sometime during the 15th or 16th centuries, a timber-framed sacristy and church porch were added to the building.

In the year 1661, the church was inspected and found to be quite dilapidated and no longer fit for use. The new church was a timber-framed cruciform building. The old church was torn down in the early 1660s and parts of the old church were reused in the construction of the new church. The lead builder was Jens Toresen. The new church had 42 rows of benches, but not much else is known about the interior. The pulpit was built in 1665 for the new church (the pulpit is now located in the chapel at the Romsdal Museum).

By the mid-1800s, the church was deemed to be too small for the parish. The new church was a wooden long church. It was designed by Jacob Wilhelm Nordan, and it is basically the same design as the Nord-Etnedal Church that Nordan had previously designed. The lead builder was the German-born master builder Friedrich Spolert from Molde, who employed Anders J. Hanset as the foreman for the project. The church was built in one month in 1869 and it was consecrated on 24 November 1869. Originally it was tarred on the exterior, but at some point, the exterior walls were covered with wooden siding and painted white.

See also
List of churches in Møre

References

Buildings and structures in Molde
Churches in Møre og Romsdal
Long churches in Norway
Wooden churches in Norway
19th-century Church of Norway church buildings
Churches completed in 1869
13th-century establishments in Norway